Laguna Salada (Spanish, "salty lagoon") is a vast dry lake some 10 meters below sea level in the Sonoran Desert of Baja California,  southwest of Mexicali. The lake's shape vaguely resembles a rhombus. When dry, the flatness of the exposed lake bed sediments makes it a favoured location for recreational driving. It is also notorious for its dust storms when dry, usually the result of monsoonal thunderstorms during the summer. During times of significant rain the lagoon can fill completely with water, leaving the unpaved road along its west bank as the only means of traversing the area.

Tectonic activity

The lake itself is located on the bottom of a shallow depression, a graben, which is linked to the San Andreas Fault, and the East Pacific Rise as part of the Laguna Salada Fault. This fault is connected to the Salton Trough fault which holds a similar depression, the Salton Sink. This sink is bigger than Laguna Salada and contains the Salton Sea.  The 2010 Baja California earthquake occurred here.

See also 
Lake Cahuilla - prehistoric lake near Laguna Salada

References

External links
 Satellite Photo (Google Maps)
 Vol. 44, Num. 1, pp. 103-111, A technical paper by Juan Contreras, Arturo Martín-Barajas and Juan Carlos Herguera on sedimentation of the LS-basin. Published in Geofísica Internacional (2005)

Salada
Landforms of Baja California
Depressions (geology)
Endorheic lakes of North America
←Mexicali Municipality